The surname Guest is derived from the Old English word giest, which in turn comes from the Old Norse word "gestr", both of which mean "guest" or "stranger."  Spelling variations may include Gest, Geste, Gueste, Ghest, Geest, Geeste, Gist, Ghost, Jest.  Other European counterparts to the name include the German and Dutch "Gast", Luxembourgish "Gaascht", Swedish "Gäst", Norwegian "Gjest", Serbian and Slovakian "Gost", Czech "Host", etc.

History
"Guest" derives from a place and not from the occupational status of some ancient forebear given to chronic visiting.  Other theories suggest a spiritual concept i.e. "guests on this earth", or a polite substitute for "serf".  Guest, the place, was near Caen, Normandy, and the original bearers of the name are said to have taken part in the Norman Conquest of England under William I in 1066.  The first recorded spelling of the family name is shown to be that of Benwoldus Guest. This was dated 1100 in the Old English Names Register, during the reign of King William II of England, 1087–1100. After the conquest, the family settled in Salop (now Shropshire) in middle-western England and apparently held the estate known as Lega from the De Dunstanvilles.  Some ancient land records show Alan De Guest granting the lands of Alric de Lega (Guest) to a monastery called Wembridge Priory in 1150.  His son Thomas (a name which occurs frequently in the Guest line) is mentioned in 1180.  Some of the other Guests of antiquity were Thomas' sons Walter and Leonard, referred to in 1194 and 1280; and Henry, son of Leonard, 1240.  Roger de Lega, or Guest, brother of Henry, had a son Thomas who again gave lands to Wembridge Priory. In 1295 Adam Gest (another variant of the name) was assessor of the parliamentary rolls in Salop.

From these Normans descended Bishop Edmund Guest (1518–1577) who became the Bishop of Salisbury (1571–1577) and was one of the Reformers.  He was the distributor of alms on behalf of Queen Elizabeth from 1560–1572.  Also of note is the eminent manufacturer Sir John Guest (1785-1852) a baronet and the elder son of Thomas Guest, part owner of the Dowlais Iron Works, who died in 1807.  History records as well the names of George Guest (1771–1831), an organist and composer who lived in Shropshire; Thomas Douglas Guest (1803–1839)  an historical and portrait painter and Joshua Guest of Yorkshire (1660–1747) a Lieutenant General whose regiment fought in the Irish Campaign under William III.  Other examples taken from church registers: Margaret Geeste married Thomas Emberson on October 5, 1546 at St. Margarets Westminster, and Edward Guest married Joane Willson at St. Botolphs Bishopsgate, city of London on September 9, 1632. 

Some Guests migrated to Ireland either as part of Henry II's (1166–1172) or any of the other various conquerors' (i.e. Oliver Cromwell's) armies or support people.  Ireland had been connected with England from the time of when the Anglo-Norman barons in the 12th century invaded Ireland and set up English rule; however, effective control of the island eluded the English until almost the end of the Tudor period in the mid-sixteenth century.

Waves of Guests migrated to the New World such as Elizabeth Guest arriving in Maryland in 1637, Walter Guest in Maryland in 1640, George Guest in Virginia in 1647, Anthony Guest in Virginia in 1663, Thomas Guest in New York in 1812, and John Guest in Pennsylvania in 1840.

People with the surname
Al Guest (contemporary), Canadian animation producer
Andrew Guest, American television writer
Ann Hutchinson Guest (born 1918), authority on dance notation and wife of Ivor Forbes Guest
Anthony Haden-Guest (born 1937), British-American writer, reporter, cartoonist, art critic, poet, and socialite
Arthur Guest (1841–1898), British politician
Barbara Guest (1920–2006), American poet and critic
Bill Guest (1928–1985), Canadian television host
Lady Charlotte Guest (1812–1895), Welsh historian and translator; wife of John Josiah Guest
C. Z. Guest (Lucille Douglas Cochrane Guest, 1920–2003), American socialite and fashion icon; daughter in-law of Frederick Edward Guest
Charles Guest (1900–1977), Royal Air Force officer
Charlie Guest (born 1993), Scottish alpine skier
Christopher Guest (born 1948), Christopher Haden-Guest, actor, writer, director, musician
Christopher John Guest (born 1975), Christopher John Guest, musician, artist, EDM composer
Colin Guest (born 1937), Australian cricketer
Cornelia Guest (born 1963), American socialite, author, businesswoman, and philanthropist
David Guest (1911–1938), British Communist mathematician and philosopher; killed in Spanish Civil War
David Guest (born 1981), Australian field hockey player
Douglas Guest (1916–1996), English organist, conductor, teacher, and composer
Edgar Guest (1881–1959), American poet
Edwin Guest (1800–1880), English antiquary
Ernest Lucas Guest (1882–1972), Rhodesian statesman, lawyer and soldier
Ernest Melville Charles Guest (1920–1943), Rhodesian-born RAF pilot of WWII, son of Ernest Lucas Guest
Frederick Edward Guest (1875–1937), British politician; MP; Secretary of State for Air; son of Ivor Bertie Guest, 1st Baron Wimborne
George Guest (disambiguation)
Geraldine Guest (1913–2006), All-American Girls Professional Baseball League player
Gladstone Guest (1917–1998), English footballer
Glenda Guest (contemporary), Australian novelist
Harry Guest (born 1938), British poet
Henry Guest (1874–1957), British politician; son of Ivor Bertie Guest, 1st Baron Wimborne
Ivor Guest (disambiguation)
Jack Guest (1906–1972), Canadian Olympic rower
Jane Mary Guest (c. 1762–1846), English composer and pianist
Jean Haden-Guest, Lady Haden-Guest (1921-2017), American theatre director and television executive
Jim Guest (born 1940), American aerospace engineer and politician; state representative
Jo Guest (born 1972), English glamor model
John Guest (disambiguation)
Judith Guest (born 1936), American novelist and screenwriter
Kim Mai Guest (born 1969), American voice actress
Lady Charlotte Guest (1812–1895), English translator and businesswoman
Lance Guest (born 1960), American actor
Lennie Guest, Australian rugby league footballer
Matthew Guest (born 1983), Designer and Animator
Melville Guest (born 1943), former British diplomat and cricketer
Michael Guest (disambiguation)
Montague Guest (1839–1909), British politician; son of John Joshua Guest
Nicholas Guest (born 1955), American actor
Oscar Guest (1888–1958), British politician; son of Ivor Bertie Guest, 1st Baron Wimborne
 Paul Guest, American poet and memoirist
Raymond R. Guest (1907–1991), American businessman, race horse owner and polo player; son of Frederick Edward Guest
Richard Guest (born 1967), English artist and short story author
Rob Guest (1950–2008), British-born New Zealand-Australian actor and singer
Robert Guest, American journalist
Ruby Haden-Guest (born 1996), British-American computer gaming editor
Stephen Guest (contemporary), New Zealand-British barrister, Solicitor, Professor
Thomas B. Guest (1816–1884), Canadian politician from Ontario; provincial legislator
Thomas Douglas Guest (1781–1845), British artist
Tim Guest (1975–2009), English author and journalist
Tom Guest (born 1984), English rugby union player
Val Guest (1911–2006), British film director
William Guest (disambiguation)

British peers
Baron Haden-Guest
Leslie Haden-Guest, 1st Baron Haden-Guest (1877–1960), British author, journalist, doctor and politician
Peter Haden-Guest, 4th Baron Haden-Guest (1913–1996), British peer
Christopher Guest (Christopher Haden-Guest, 5th Baron Haden-Guest) (born 1948), British-American comedian and actor
Guest family, descendants of John Guest (1722–1787), a manager of Dowlais Ironworks
Ivor Bertie Guest, 1st Baron Wimborne (1835–1914), British peer; son of John Josiah Guest: uncle-by-marriage of Winston Churchill
Ivor Guest, 1st Viscount Wimborne (1873–1939), British politician, Lord Lieutenant of Ireland; son of Ivor Bertie Guest
Ivor Guest, 2nd Viscount Wimborne (1903–1967), British politician

People named with other variants
Gest (surname)

See also
 Guest (disambiguation)

References

English-language surnames